Lampegia (d. after 730) was a legendary Aquitanian noblewoman.

She was the daughter of Odo the Great. Her father arranged for her to marry Munuza, Governor of Catalonia, in an alliance toward the Franks. Her spouse rebelled against Abd al-Rahman ibn Abd Allah al-Ghafiqi, who in 730 took the Llivia Fortress, executed Munuza and sent Lampegia as a slave to the harem of Hisham ibn Abd al-Malik in Damascus. 

Her fate made her a legendary figure.

References

8th-century births
8th-century deaths
Women from the Umayyad Caliphate
8th-century people from the Umayyad Caliphate
Arabian slaves and freedmen
Medieval slaves
Slaves from the Umayyad Caliphate
Slave concubines